The following is a list of episodes for the television series Masked Rider.

References

Masked Rider